Abderina is a genus of beetles belonging to the family Melandryidae.

The species of this genus are found in Central Europe.

Species:
 Abderina helmii Seidlitz, 1898

References

Melandryidae